Daniel "Dani" Löble (born 22 February 1973) is a Swiss-German drummer, who has been a member of German power metal band Helloween since 2005.

Biography

Dani began his career with Rawhead Rexx, a band that he helped form but departed due to his new commitments to Helloween. He was also a touring drummer for Blaze Bayley from October 2004 to December 2005. He lives in Steißlingen.

Regarding his role in Helloween when compared to his two predecessors, Ingo Schwichtenberg and Uli Kusch, Dani was quoted as saying: "I view my style as a symbiosis of Schwichtenberg and Kusch. I'm not as straightforward as Ingo but not as technical as Uli. I have my own style."

In August 2008, Dani inked an endorsement deal with Paiste and states being extremely happy with his new cymbal setup, which features the new Signature Reflector Heavy Full Crash models and describes them as being warm, full, and 'sounding straight as an arrow' with a silvery shimmer.

Discography

Höllenhunde  
 Alptraum (1994)

Element 58 
 April Fools' Day (2000)

Rawhead Rexx 
Rawhead Rexx (AFM Records, 2002)
Diary In Black (AFM Records, 2004)

Helloween 
 Keeper of the Seven Keys: The Legacy (2005)
 Keeper of the Seven Keys – The Legacy World Tour 2005/2006 (2007)
 Gambling with the Devil (2007)
 Unarmed – Best of 25th Anniversary (2009)
 7 Sinners (2010)
 Straight Out of Hell (2013)
My God-Given Right (2015)
Helloween (2021)

DVDs 

 Keeper Of The Seven Keys - The Legacy: Live On 3 Continents (2007)
 United Alive (2019)

References

External links
Helloween

German heavy metal drummers
Male drummers
German male musicians
Helloween members
Living people
1973 births
20th-century American drummers
American male drummers
21st-century American drummers
20th-century American male musicians
21st-century American male musicians